The City Destroyed (French: La cité foudroyée) is a 1924 French silent film directed by Luitz-Morat.

Synopsis

A young engineer having discovered how to manipulate lightning threatens to destroy Paris if he is not paid a ransom.

Cast
 Daniel Mendaille as Richard Gallée  
 Jane Maguenat as Huguette  
 Armand Morins as Baron de Vrécourt 
 Alexis Ghasne as Hans Steinberg  
 Lucien Cazalis as Grosset 
 Paul Journée as Battling Martel  
 Simone Judic as La bonne  
 Émilien Richard as Cuivredasse

References

Bibliography 
 William J. Fanning, Jr. Death Rays and the Popular Media, 1876-1939: A Study of Directed Energy Weapons in Fact, Fiction and Film. McFarland, 2015.

External links 
 

1924 films
French silent feature films
1920s French-language films
Films directed by Luitz-Morat
French black-and-white films
1920s French films